The Smoking Gunns were a professional wrestling tag team of kayfabe brothers Billy Gunn (Monty Sopp) and Bart Gunn (Mike Polchlopek). They portrayed cowboys in the World Wrestling Federation (WWF) from 1993 to 1996. As a team, the Smoking Gunns won the WWF Tag Team Championship three times.

History
Polchlopek and Sopp began teaming as the "Long Riders" in the International Wrestling Federation. Polchlopek wrestled as Brett Colt, while Sopp was known as Kip Winchester. They won the IWF World Tag Team Championship together twice before signing with the World Wrestling Federation.

The Smoking Gunns made their WWF debut on April 5, 1993 on the day after WrestleMania IX, defeating jobbers Barry Horowitz and Reno Riggins. Their first pay-per-view appearance was at the King of the Ring 1993 in an eight-man tag team match. The Gunns and the Steiner Brothers scored the win over The Headshrinkers and Money Incorporated when Billy pinned Ted DiBiase. Their next big match came at SummerSlam 1993, when they teamed up with Tatanka to defeat Bam Bam Bigelow and The Headshrinkers.

From their debut until January 1994, they would fire blanks in the arena with real guns, but then they received complaints from families that they were scaring children, which caused them to stop firing guns in the arenas. 

Although they continued to wrestle as a team, they did not appear together again on a WWF pay-per-view for over a year. In the fall of 1994, the Gunns began a feud with the Heavenly Bodies (Tom Prichard and Jimmy Del Ray). The Bodies attacked the Smoking Gunns and destroyed their cowboy hats. In return, the Gunns grabbed the Bodies' robes and tore off the wings. The teams had a series of matches at house shows, but the feud did not end with a blow off match. Instead, the teams faced off as part of a 5-on-5 elimination match at Survivor Series 1994. Billy and Bart joined forces with Lex Luger, Mabel, and Adam Bomb in a loss to Ted DiBiase's team of King Kong Bundy, Tatanka, Bam Bam Bigelow, and The Heavenly Bodies.

The Gunns were scheduled to compete in a tournament for the vacant tag-team title after Shawn Michaels and Diesel, the champions, began feuding. Injuries prevented the Gunns from entering, however. One day after their replacements, Bob "Spark Plug" Holly and the 1-2-3 Kid, won the belts, the Gunns returned to win the title on January 23, 1995. At WrestleMania XI, the Gunns faced Owen Hart and a mystery partner, who was revealed to be Yokozuna and lost the belts. They regained the title from Hart and Yokozuna on September 25 of that year.

By October 1995, Billy shaved his mustache and cut his long hair, but Bart kept his mustache and long hair until March 1996.

The Gunns held the title until February 15, 1996, when Billy was forced to undergo neck surgery, and The Smoking Gunns had to forfeit their title. Billy recovered quickly, the Gunns won their final championship three months later by defeating The Godwinns at In Your House 8: Beware of Dog. Following this victory, Sunny left the Godwinns to manage the Gunns later the team was called "Sunny and her Gunns". Sunny was a heel manager and manipulated the Gunns, causing the brothers to argue. Sunny and Billy had an onscreen relationship, which bothered Bart, then on Superstars October 27, 1996 Billy walked out on Bart. Then on the October 28, 1996 episode of Raw Sunny finally caused The Gunns to implode, which lead to a 4-on-4 classic Survivor Series elimination match on The Survivor Series's Free for All. Following that, on the December 16, 1996 episode of Raw, Bart Gunn hit Billy with a Botched Stun Gunn on the top rope that gave Billy a neck injury. It was then rumored that at WrestleMania 13 the Gunns were supposed to face against each other 1 on 1 but the match didn't happen. In addition, the team began to act more like heels, wrestling more aggressively, acting more arrogantly and teaming with other heels.

Split
Sunny eventually caused the team's downfall, as she became the source of infighting between the two. When the Smoking Gunns lost their tag team title to Owen Hart and the British Bulldog in September 1996 at In Your House 10: Mind Games, Sunny left the team because she only wanted to be a manager for title holders (although she did not become Hart and Bulldog's manager). Billy, frustrated with losing both the title and Sunny, turned against Bart. Billy briefly feuded with Bart. After facing each other in tag team matches, the feud culminated in a one-on-one battle. During the match, Bart accidentally injured Billy's neck, forcing Billy to take some time off and drawing their feud to an abrupt halt. On June 9, 1997 Billy as Rockabilly defeated Bart on Raw Is War. Afterwards Bart left the WWF.

Soon after, Bart went to wrestle for the National Wrestling Alliance (NWA), and when he returned to WWF in 1998, he was mainly involved in storylines with other NWA talent, and his opponents in the Brawl for All tournament, which he won. At Wrestlemania XV he lost to Butterbean in a boxing match. At the King of the Ring (1998) Billy and Bart faced each other in a tag team match between the Midnight Express and the New Age Outlaws. Bart was released in April 1999, before he could have another angle with Billy.

After the breakup, Billy was given the new gimmick of Rockabilly being managed by The Honky Tonk Man. It failed to catch on, however, and he became "Badd Ass" Billy Gunn and later won the Intercontinental Championship, the Hardcore Championship twice, and the 1999 King of the Ring tournament, in addition to eight more tag team titles. He formed The New Age Outlaws with Road Dogg. He was released by the company in November 2004 after serving 11 years.

Championships and accomplishments
International Wrestling Federation
IWF Tag Tag Championship (3 times)
World Wrestling Federation
WWF Tag Team Championship (3 times)
Raw Bowl

References

Independent promotions teams and stables
WWE teams and stables
WWE World Tag Team Champions